was the lead ship of the  of pre-dreadnought battleships built for the Imperial Japanese Navy by the British firm of Thames Iron Works in the late 1890s. The ship participated in the Russo-Japanese War of 1904–1905, including the Battle of Port Arthur on the second day of the war with her sister . Fuji fought in the Battles of the Yellow Sea and Tsushima and was lightly damaged in the latter action. The ship was reclassified as a coastal defence ship in 1910 and served as a training ship for the rest of her career. She was hulked in 1922 and finally broken up for scrap in 1948.

Design and description

The two Fuji-class ships were the IJN's first battleships, ordered from Britain in response to two new German-built Chinese ironclad warships. At this time, Japan lacked the technology and capability to construct its own battleships and they had to be built abroad. The ships were designed by Philip Watts as smaller versions of the British Royal Sovereign class, although they were slightly faster and had a better type of armour. She normally displaced  and had a crew of 637 officers and enlisted men. The ship was powered by two Humphrys Tennant vertical triple-expansion steam engines using steam generated by 10 cylindrical boilers.

The ship's main battery consisted of four  guns mounted in two twin gun turrets, one forward and one aft. The secondary battery consisted of ten  quick-firing guns, four mounted in casemates on the sides of the hull and six mounted on the upper deck, protected by gun shields. A number of smaller guns were carried for defence against torpedo boats. These included fourteen  3-pounder guns and ten 2.5-pounder Hotchkiss guns of the same calibre. She was also armed with five 18-inch torpedo tubes.

Construction and career
Fuji, named after Mount Fuji, was ordered as part of the 1894 Naval Programme and the ship was laid down by Thames Iron Works at their Blackwall, London shipyard on 1 August 1894. The ship was launched on 31 March 1896 and completed on 17 August 1897.  The work was supervised by a team of over 240 engineers and naval officers from Japan, including future Prime Ministers Saitō Makoto and Katō Tomosaburō. While fitting out at Portland, she participated in the fleet review marking Queen Victoria's Diamond Jubilee on 26 June 1897 at Spithead before departing for Japan via the Suez Canal.

In 1901, the ship exchanged 16 of her 47 mm guns for an equal number of QF 12 pounder 12 cwt guns. This raised the number of crewmen to 652 and later to 741.

At the start of the Russo-Japanese War, Fuji, commanded by Captain Matsumoto Kazu, was assigned to the 1st Division of the 1st Fleet. She participated in the Battle of Port Arthur on 9 February 1904 when Admiral Tōgō Heihachirō led the 1st Fleet in an attack on the Russian ships of the Pacific Squadron anchored just outside Port Arthur. Tōgō had expected his surprise night attack on the Russians by his destroyers to be much more successful than it actually was and expected to find them badly disorganized and weakened, but the Russians had recovered from their surprise and were ready for his attack. Tōgō chose to attack the Russian coastal defences with his main armament and engage the Russian ships with his secondary guns. Splitting his fire proved to be a bad idea as the Japanese  and six-inch guns inflicted very little significant damage on the Russian ships who concentrated all their fire on the Japanese ships with some effect. Although a large number of ships on both sides were hit, Russian casualties numbered only 17 while the Japanese suffered 60 killed and wounded before Tōgō disengaged. Fuji was hit by two shells during the battle that killed two and wounded 10 crewmen.

They fired 154 twelve-inch shells, but did little damage. When they tried again on 22 March, they were attacked by Russian coast defence guns that had been transferred there by the new Russian commander, Vice Admiral Stepan Makarov, and also from several Russian ships in Port Arthur using observers overlooking Pigeon Bay. The Japanese ships disengaged after Fuji was hit by a 12-inch shell.

Fuji participated in the action of 13 April when Tōgō successfully lured out a portion of the Pacific Squadron, including Makarov's flagship, the battleship . When Makarov spotted the six battleships of the 1st Division, he turned back for Port Arthur and Petropavlovsk struck a minefield laid by the Japanese the previous night. The Russian battleship sank in less than two minutes after one of her magazines exploded, Makarov one of the 677 killed. Emboldened by his success, Tōgō resumed long-range bombardment missions, which prompted the Russians to lay more minefields.

During the Battle of the Yellow Sea in August, Fuji was not hit because the Russian ships concentrated their fire on the leading ship of the column, Tōgō's flagship, the battleship . During the Battle of Tsushima in May 1905, she was hit a dozen times; the most serious of which penetrated the hood of the rear barbette, ignited some exposed propellant charges and killed eight men and wounded nine. After the ammunition fire was put out, the left gun in the barbette resumed firing and apparently fired the coup de grâce that sank the battleship .

On 23 October 1908, Fuji hosted a dinner for the American Ambassador and the seniormost officers of the Great White Fleet during their circumnavigation of the world. In 1910, her cylindrical boilers were replaced by Miyabara water-tube boilers and her main armament was replaced by Japanese-built guns. Fuji was reclassified as a first-class coast defence ship that same year, and was used for training duties in various capacities until disarmed in 1922. She spent all of World War I based at Kure. Her hulk continued to be used as a floating barracks and training center at Yokosuka until 1945. Fuji was damaged by American carrier aircraft during their 18 July 1945 attack on Yokosuka and capsized after the end of the war. The ship was scrapped in 1948.

Notes

Footnotes

References 
 
 
 
 
 
 
 
 
 
 
 (contact the editor at lars.ahlberg@halmstad.mail.postnet.se for subscription information)

External links

Fuji-class battleships
Ships built in Leamouth
1896 ships
Naval ships of Japan
Russo-Japanese War battleships of Japan
World War I battleships of Japan
World War II naval ships of Japan